Tessa Worley (born 4 October 1989) is a French former World Cup alpine ski racer and non-commissioned officer. She previously competed in all five alpine disciplines and specialised

Career

Born in Annemasse, in the département of Haute-Savoie, Worley's father Steve is Australian and her mother Madeleine is French, as such she possesses both French and Australian citizenships. She grew up skiing year-round, in France and New Zealand, and her home ski area is the resort of Le Grand-Bornand.

Worley made her World Cup debut at age 16 in February 2006, and finished in 29th place in a giant slalom in Ofterschwang, Germany. She was fifth in the first race of the 2009 season, a giant slalom in Sölden, Austria, in October 2008.  A month later, she gained her first World Cup victory (and first podium) in giant slalom at Aspen, United States.

Early in the 2011 season, Worley won three consecutive giant slalom races before January. In February, she won a gold medal in the team event at the World Championships in Garmisch-Partenkirchen, Germany, and was also the bronze medalist in the giant slalom. At the next edition in 2013 at Schladming, Worley won both runs of the giant slalom to claim the world  

Two days after her eighth World Cup win, Worley was injured in a slalom in France in December 2013.  the tails of her skis in the first run at Courchevel, she tore the anterior cruciate ligament in her right knee and also had some lateral meniscus damage. It ended Worley's 2014 World Cup season and kept her out of the

World Cup results

Season titles
2 titles – (2 giant slalom)

Season standings
{| class="wikitable" style="font-size:95%; text-align:center; border:grey solid 1px; border-collapse:collapse;" width="40%"
|- style="background-color:#369; color:white;"
|rowspan="2" colspan="1" width="5%"|Season
|- style="background-color:#4180be; color:white;"
| width="3%"|Age
| width="5%"|Overall
| width="5%"|Slalom
| width="5%"|GiantSlalom
| width="5%"|Super-G
| width="5%"|Downhill
| width="5%"|Combined
|- style="background-color:#8CB2D8; color:white;"
|-
| 2006 || 16 || 118 || — || 57 || — || — || —
|-
| 2007 ||17|| colspan=6|
|-
| 2008 ||18|| 42 || — || 14 || — || — || —
|-
| 2009 ||19|| 39 || — || 11 || — || — || —
|-
| 2010 ||20|| 37 || 37 || 13 || — || — || —
|-
| 2011 ||21|| 16 || 34 || bgcolor="silver"|2 || 43 || — || 27
|-
| 2012 ||22|| 11 || 27 || bgcolor="cc9966"|3 || 37 || 39 || 23
|-
| 2013 ||23|| 11 || 38 || 4 || 22 || — || 25
|-
| 2014 ||24|| 40 || — || 16 || 22 || — || —
|-
| 2015 ||25|| 46 || — || 13 || 34 || — || —
|-
| 2016 ||26|| 27 || — || 11 || 21 || 35 || 11
|-
| 2017 ||27|| 6 || — || bgcolor="gold"| 1 || 9 ||  — || 32
|-
| 2018 ||28|| 13 || — || bgcolor="silver"| 2 || 18 || 50 || —
|-
| 2019||29||14||—||bgcolor="cc9966"|3 || — ||—||—
|-
| 2020||30||29||—|| 8 || 30 ||—||—
|-
| 2021||31||12||—|| bgcolor="cc9966"|3 || 17 ||—|| rowspan=3 
|-
| 2022||32||8||—||bgcolor="gold"|1||13|| —
|-
| 2023||33||17||— ||8||14||—
|}

Race podiums
 16 wins – (16 GS)
 36 podiums – (36 GS)

World Championship results

Olympic results

References

External links

 – ''

1989 births
Living people
People from Annemasse
French female alpine skiers
Alpine skiers at the 2010 Winter Olympics
Alpine skiers at the 2018 Winter Olympics
Alpine skiers at the 2022 Winter Olympics
Olympic alpine skiers of France
French people of Australian descent
Sportspeople from Haute-Savoie